Justice Rogers may refer to:

Chase T. Rogers (born 1956), chief justice of the Connecticut Supreme Court
Horatio Rogers Jr. (1836–1904), associate justice of the Rhode Island Supreme Court
John G. Rogers (1849–1926), associate justice of the Maryland Court of Appeals
Wynne Grey Rogers (1874–1946), associate justice of the Louisiana Supreme Court

See also
Judge Rogers (disambiguation)